Nammal is a 2002 Indian Malayalam-language romantic comedy-drama film directed by Kamal and written by Kalavoor Ravikumar. The film features Jishnu, Sidharth Bharathan in the lead roles. It was the debut film of Sidharth, Renuka, and Bhavana. The music was composed by Mohan Sithara. The film was shot in Government Engineering College, Thrissur and Holy Trinity School, Kanjikode.

Nammal was released on 20 December 2002 and was a commercial success at the box office. The film received three Kerala State Film AwardsBest Film with Popular Appeal and Aesthetic Value, Special Mention (Bhavana), and Best Art Director. It was remade in Telugu as Dost (2004).

Plot
Snehalatha becomes the Principal of a college where Shyam and Shivan are the heroes. Shyam and Shivan are fun filled characters as well as naughty. Aparna is teased and ragged by the duo, who happens to be the daughter of Principal's friend. Aparna complains and Snehalatha takes action against Shyam and Shivan. Soon to her surprise she discovers that Shyam and Shivan are orphans, hardworking their way up the ladder and their guardian is a priest. But the real twist to the story happens when Snehalatha learns that one of them is her son. And the son happens to be Shyam.

Cast
 Jishnu Raghavan as Shivan (voiceover by Mithun Ramesh)
 Sidharth Bharathan as Shyam (voiceover by Sarath Das)
 Renuka Menon as Aparna
 Bhavana as Parimalam
 Balachandra Menon as Sathyanathan
 Innocent as Shanmughan
 Suhasini Maniratnam as Snehalatha (voiceover by Bhagyalakshmi)
 Mithun Ramesh as Reji (voiceover by Jis Joy)
 Vignesh as Senthil, Parimalam's brother
 T. P. Madhavan as Principal
  Vijeesh as Jojo Thomas / Noolunda
 Ambika Mohan as Jojo Thomas's mother
 Yamuna as Damayanthi
 Kulappulli Leela
 Kalabhavan Shajohn
 Shine Tom Chacko in an uncredited role

Soundtrack 
The film's soundtrack contains five songs, all composed by Mohan Sithara. The lyrics were written by Kaithapram Damodaran.

Box office
Nammal was a commercial success at the box office.

Awards

References

External links
 

2002 films
2000s Malayalam-language films
Malayalam films remade in other languages
Films directed by Kamal (director)
Films scored by Mohan Sithara
Films scored by Kaithapram Damodaran Namboothiri
Films shot in Thrissur
Indian romantic comedy-drama films